Luigi Ferrero (26 December 1904 – 30 October 1984) was an Italian football manager and former player. A forward, he spent time with some of the top clubs in his country such as Inter and others.

Honours
Juventus
 Italian Prima Divisione champion: 1925–26.

References

1904 births
1984 deaths
Association football forwards
Italian football managers
Italian footballers
Serie A players
Serie B players
Juventus F.C. players
S.S.D. Lucchese 1905 players
U.S. Pistoiese 1921 players
Inter Milan players
S.S.C. Bari players
Torino F.C. players
Torino F.C. managers
S.S.C. Bari managers
Delfino Pescara 1936 managers
ACF Fiorentina managers
S.S.D. Lucchese 1905 managers
Atalanta B.C. managers
Hellas Verona F.C. managers
S.S. Lazio managers
Inter Milan managers
S.P.A.L. managers